The Atlantic Highlands School District is a community public school district that serves students in pre-kindergarten through sixth grade from Atlantic Highlands, in Monmouth County, New Jersey, United States.

As of the 2018–19 school year, the district, comprising one school, had an enrollment of 311 students and 30.5 classroom teachers (on an FTE basis), for a student–teacher ratio of 10.2:1.

The district is classified by the New Jersey Department of Education as being in District Factor Group "GH", the third-highest of eight groupings. District Factor Groups organize districts statewide to allow comparison by common socioeconomic characteristics of the local districts. From lowest socioeconomic status to highest, the categories are A, B, CD, DE, FG, GH, I and J.

For seventh through twelfth grades, public school students attend Henry Hudson Regional High School, a comprehensive six-year high school and regional public school district that serves students from both Atlantic Highlands and Highlands.  As of the 2018–19 school year, the high school had an enrollment of 331 students and 39.1 classroom teachers (on an FTE basis), for a student–teacher ratio of 8.5:1.

School
Atlantic Highlands Elementary School had an enrollment of 311 students in the 2018–19 school year.
Lori Skibinski, Principal

Administration
Core members of the district's administration are:
Dr. Susan E. Compton, Superintendent
Janet Sherlock, Business Administrator / Board Secretary

Compton serves jointly as Tri-District Superintendent of Schools for the Atlantic Highlands School District, the Highlands School District and the Henry Hudson Regional High School.

Board of education
The district's board of education has nine members who set policy and oversee the fiscal and educational operation of the district through its administration. As a Type II school district, the board's trustees are elected directly by voters to serve three-year terms of office on a staggered basis, with three seats up for election each year held (since 2012) as part of the November general election.

References

External links
Atlantic Highlands School District

School Data for the Atlantic Highlands School District, National Center for Education Statistics
Henry Hudson Regional High School

Atlantic Highlands, New Jersey
New Jersey District Factor Group GH
School districts in Monmouth County, New Jersey
Public elementary schools in New Jersey